Thiotricha flagellatrix is a moth of the family Gelechiidae. It was described by Edward Meyrick in 1929. It is found in Assam, India.

The wingspan is 10–11 mm. The forewings are white or whitish with a slender grey streak beneath the costal edge from the base to the middle and a slender irregular very oblique dark fuscous streak from near the middle of the dorsum to the disc beyond two-thirds. There are two very oblique dark fuscous streaks (the second browner) from the costa towards the apex reaching halfway across the wing, meeting a fine dark fuscous terminal line rising from an inwards-oblique mark from the tornus and ending in a small black apical dot. The hindwings are grey.

References

Moths described in 1929
Thiotricha
Taxa named by Edward Meyrick